George Fleetwood was the Archdeacon of Totnes in 1713.

He married Dorothy, daughter of Sir George Farewell.

References

Archdeacons of Totnes
18th-century British clergy